Gura Jub-e Qeshlaq (also Romanized as Gūrā Jūb-e Qeshlāq; also known as Gūrājū Qeshlāq) is a village in Gurani Rural District, Gahvareh District, Dalahu County, Kermanshah Province, Iran. At the 2006 census, its population was 60, in 16 families.

References 

Populated places in Dalahu County